The 1963–64 Boston Bruins season was the 40th season for the franchise. The Bruins missed the playoffs for the fifth consecutive season. Goaltender Ed Johnston appeared in every game, becoming the final goaltender in NHL history to play every minute of every game.

Offseason

Regular season

Final standings

Record vs. opponents

Schedule and results

Player statistics

Regular season
Scoring

Goaltending

Awards and records

Transactions

Draft picks
Boston's picks at the 1963 NHL Entry Draft, which was the first amateur draft in league history, picking 16-year-olds.  None of the players picked ever played professional hockey.

References
 Bruins on Hockey Database

Boston Bruins seasons
Boston Bruins
Boston Bruins
Boston Bruins
Boston Bruins
1960s in Boston